Mubi North is a Local Government Area of Adamawa State, Nigeria. The town is the location of the Adamawa State University and the Federal Polytechnic, Mubi.
 

Local Government Areas in Adamawa State